is located in Kasugai, Aichi, Japan.

Chubu University was established as the Chubu Institute of Technology in 1964 with the motto 
"Acta, non Verba" (Actions, not Words), but its institutional history begins with the Nagoya Daichi High School established in 1938. It was renamed as Chubu University in 1984, and has been subsequently expanded to comprise seven schools and six graduate schools, with about 11,000 students and twenty research institutions.

Location
  
It is located on a hill with full of green trees in City of Kasugai neighboring in the north of City of Nagoya with the population of 2.3 million, the central city of Chubu (meaning Central Japan). There are Japanese major industries such as automobile industry including Toyota and Honda, aerospace industry including Heavy Industries of Mitsubishi and Kawasaki as well as small high skill manufacturers producing one-third of parts of Boeing jets and Mitsubishi Regional Jet, textile industry including Toray producing carbon fiber. Chubu University has strong connections with these big and small industries.

Sustainability sciences

Whilst, Chubu University has promoted sustainability sciences including certified as a Regional Center of UNESCO ESD (Education for Sustainable Development), and the connections with NASA in digital earth research, with Club of Rome and United Nations Center for Regional Development in global critical issues, SDGs and quality of life and with JICA (Japan International Cooperation Agency) in smart transport and city planning in developing countries.

Distinguished scholars and their research

Chancellor Atsuo Iiyoshi, the plasma physicist, was the leader of Japan team in international competition in nuclear fusion method in 80’s and President of National Institute for Fusion Science. President Osamu Ishihara, also plasma physicist, has experienced to teach in US for 25 years and Life fellow of IEEE. Okitsugu Yamashita, Ex President, is an entomologist and received prizes such as Louis Pasteur Prize.

Institute of Science and technology are gathering eminent researchers including Hisashi Yamamoto (Catalyst Chemistry, President of Japan Society of Chemistry, awarded including Japan Academy Prize, Roger Adams Prize), Mitsuo Sawamoto (Molecule Chemistry, awarded including Benjamin Franklin Medal) and Yoshitsugu Hayashi (Sustainable and Well-being City, Full Member of Club of Rome, President of World Conference on Transport Research Society).

Chubu Institute for Advanced Studies has also excellent researchers including Takaho Ando (History of Philosophy, awarded Japan Academy Prize), Hiromichi Fukui (Digital Earth) and Kimitaka Kawamura (Atmospheric Chemistry, awards including Geochemical Society Geochemical Fellow).

Center for Applied Superconductivity and Sustainable Energy Research directed by Sakutaro Yamaguchi has achieved the world top performance in electricity transmission, i.e. 1 million kw by a coil only in 5 cm diameter covered by a 30 cm pipe for cooling at minus 196 degrees in Celsius. This technology will bring a revolution in electricity transmission by replacing huge infrastructure of several 100m high pylons by a pipe in 30 cm diameter. Electric companies in Europe and Asia have much interest in it.

Visiting Scholars
Chubu University gathers eminent visiting professors including Kōichirō Matsuura (Emeritus Member of the Club of Rome, former Director-General of UNESCO), Alexander Likhotal (Full Member of Club of Rome, Ex.President of Green Cross International, Spokesman under President Gorbachev of Soviet Union), Timothy Foresman (Principal Researcher for Digital Earth Project under Vice-President Al Gore), etc.

Outreaching activities to local society
Outreach activities of the university are extended to local society very actively. A competitive fund was awarded for the revitalization of Kozoji New Town, which was constructed as one of the big new towns built in Tokyo, Nagoya and Osaka metropolitan areas in 1970’s and has been recently declining due to the aging of inhabitants. Cultural events such as Chubu University Music Festival, Adult College, and Kids Seminar are popular among the local citizens.

Sports
Chubu University is active also in sports, particularly in handball, kendo and baseball, of which teams have been always selected to Japanese university championship. The Handball club became the Champion in 2014. Also, professional baseball players have been produced. It has excellent sports facilities including all-weather 400m x 6 lane track, 4-story budo (kendo, judo) arena, one of the best among Japanese universities.

International Affiliations
Chubu University has 44 international affiliations as listed below. Amongst them, 40 years long special cooperation with Ohio University since 1977 is worthy of special mention. PASEO (Preparation for Academic Study in English Overseas) in Chubu University was originally started in 1991 in which lecturers sent by Ohio University are teaching. Student exchange has counted several hundred during 40 years. Yamada House in Ohio University campus was donated by Chubu University and Cupola in Chubu University campus was donated by Ohio University.　

USA
Ohio University
West Virginia University
Michigan State University
Canada
University of British Columbia
Mexico
Universidad de Guanajuato
Germany 
Friedrich-Schiller-Universität Jena
Johannes Gutenberg-Universität Mainz
France
ENSEIRB-MATMECA（École Nationale Supérieure d'Électronique, Informatique, Télécommunications, Mathématique et Mécanique de Bordeaux）
Université de La Rochelle
Switzerland
University of Zurich
UK
Eckersley Oxford
Russia
Research and Development Center at Federal Grid Company of Unified Energy System
Lithuania
Vytauto Didžiojo Universitetas
Australia
University of New England
Korea
Wonkwang University
Thailand
Chulalongkorn University, Faculty of Engineering
King Mongkut’s Institute of Technology Ladkrabang
Asian Institute of Technology
Malaysia
Universiti Sains Malaysia
Indonesia
Universitas Gadjah Mada
Syiah Kuala University, Faculty of Agriculture
India
Indian Institute of Technology Guwahati
Tata Institute of Fundamental Research
China
Harbin University of Science and Technology
China Foreign Affairs University
East China Normal University
Tongji University
Harbin Institute of Technology
Anhui University of Science and Technology
China Huadian Electric Power Research Institute
Institute of Electrical Engineering, Chinese Academy of Science
Tongji Zhejiang College
Northeastern University, Institute of Materials and Metallurgy
Jiaxing University
Shaoxing University
Nepal
Kathmandu University
ICIMOD: International Center for Integrated Mountain Development
Bhutan
The Council for Renewable Natural Resources Research of Bhutan
Fiji
Fiji National University
Morocco
Université Mohammed V
Tunisia
University of Tunis El Manar
Algeria
University of Science and Technology of Oran Mohamed Boudiaf

References

External links
Chubu University 

Private universities and colleges in Japan
Educational institutions established in 1938
Universities and colleges in Aichi Prefecture
Kasugai, Aichi
1938 establishments in Japan